William Hoge (1762September 25, 1814) was a member of the United States House of Representatives from Pennsylvania.

Biography
Hoge was born near Hogestown in the Province of Pennsylvania.  He received a limited schooling and moved to western Pennsylvania in 1782, where he and his brother John founded the town of Washington, Pennsylvania.  He was a member of the Pennsylvania House of Representatives in 1796 and 1797.

Hoge was elected as a Democratic-Republican to the Seventh and Eighth United States Congresses and served until his resignation on October 15, 1804.  He was again elected to the Tenth Congress.  He retired to his farm near Washington, Pennsylvania, where he died in 1814.  Interment in the "Old Graveyard."

Sources

1762 births
1814 deaths
Members of the Pennsylvania House of Representatives
People from Washington County, Pennsylvania
People from Cumberland County, Pennsylvania
American city founders
Democratic-Republican Party members of the United States House of Representatives from Pennsylvania
18th-century American politicians
19th-century American politicians